Gavin Grant Smith is a Scottish science fiction writer who was born in Dundee, Scotland in 1973. He is the author of the Veteran series. He has a degree in writing for film and a Masters in medieval history.

Works
 Veteran (2010) – Nominated for 2011 John W. Campbell Memorial Award for Best Science Fiction Novel
 War in Heaven (2011), sequel to Veteran
 Crysis Escalation (2013)
 The Age of Scorpio (2012)
 A Quantum Mythology (2015), sequel to The Age of Scorpio
 The Beauty of Destruction (2016)
 The Hangman's Daughter: The Bastard Legion Book 1 (January 2017)
 Special Purposes: First Strike Weapon (April 2017)
 Friendly Fire: The Bastard Legion Book 2 (expected October 2017)

With Stephen Deas under the name Gavin Deas
 Elite: Wanted (2014)
 Empires: Infiltration (2014)
 Empires: Extraction (2014)

References

Writers from Dundee
Scottish novelists
Living people
Year of birth missing (living people)
Scottish male novelists